Thomas Jerome Hawkins (December 22, 1936 – August 16, 2017) was an American professional basketball player.

A 6'5" (1.96 m) forward, Hawkins starred at Chicago's Parker (now Robeson) High School before playing at the University of Notre Dame, where he became the school's first African-American basketball star.  He was then selected by the Minneapolis (later Los Angeles) Lakers in the first round of the 1959 NBA draft, and he would have a productive ten-year career in the league, playing for the Lakers as well as the Cincinnati Royals as he registered 6,672 career points and 4,607 career rebounds.

Hawkins later worked in radio and television broadcasting in Los Angeles and served as vice president of communications for the Los Angeles Dodgers baseball team.

Hawkins died in his home in Malibu, California on August 16, 2017.

References

External links
Career stats at www.basketball-reference.com
Profile at University of Notre Dame's Official Athletic Site

1936 births
2017 deaths
African-American basketball players
All-American college men's basketball players
American men's basketball players
Basketball players from Chicago
Cincinnati Royals players
College basketball announcers in the United States
Los Angeles Clippers announcers
Los Angeles Lakers players
Minneapolis Lakers draft picks
Minneapolis Lakers players
Notre Dame Fighting Irish men's basketball players
Power forwards (basketball)
Small forwards
20th-century African-American sportspeople
21st-century African-American people